Tracye McQuirter is an African-American public health nutritionist, vegan activist, author, and speaker.

Background
McQuirter grew up in Washington D.C. and graduated from Sidwell Friends School in 1984. She received her B.A. from Amherst College in 1988 and her Masters in Public Health Nutrition (MPH) from New York University in 2003.

Career
Actor and activist Dick Gregory introduced McQuirter to vegetarianism in 1986 when he gave a talk on the subject at Amherst during her sophomore year. When she was a junior, she spent a semester in Kenya and had experiences there that made her decide to become a vegetarian. During her second semester, when she was an exchange student at Howard University, she discovered what she later described as a "large Black vegan and vegetarian community in Washington D.C." This group, which was also influenced by Gregory and his book Dick Gregory’s Natural Diet for Folks Who Eat: Cookin’ With Mother Nature, taught her how to be a vegan. However, at that time McQuirter notes that, "there were not a lot of options in terms of grocery stores. There was no Whole Foods... we had to basically cook everything for ourselves." 

McQuirter co-founded "BlackVegetarians.com" (1996-1997), the first vegan website by and for African Americans. According to the New York Times, her 2010 book, By Any Greens Necessary contributed to the rise of veganism among African-Americans between the time of its release and 2017 (when the article was published). In addition, she co-authored the African American Vegan Starter Guide in 2016 with the Farm Sanctuary, was named a "New Food Hero" by the Vegetarian Times in 2017, and her vegan cookbook Ageless Vegan was listed as one of the "16 Best Healthy Cookbooks" of 2018 by Self Magazine. In 2019, she was inducted into the U.S. Animal Rights Hall of Fame  and PBS named her a "Woman Thought Leader."

Bibliography

References

External links

Living people
Year of birth missing (living people)
21st-century African-American people
21st-century African-American women
African-American women writers
African-American writers
American cookbook writers
American food writers
American podcasters
American veganism activists
American women podcasters
American women writers
Amherst College alumni
Chefs of vegan cuisine
New York University alumni
People from Washington, D.C.
Sidwell Friends School alumni
Vegan cookbook writers
Women cookbook writers
Women food writers